Ramy Essam (born 1987 in Mansoura) is an Egyptian musician. He is best known for his appearances in Tahrir Square in Cairo during the Egyptian Revolution of 2011. Ramy is one of the few singers in Middle East to sing hard rock.

In 2011, Ramy was considered the voice of the Egyptian revolution. During the height of the uprising, Ramy performed in front of millions of people in the Tahrir Square. His song Irhal, in which then Egyptian president Hosni Mubarak was urged to resign, gained popularity among the demonstrators. It became internationally known through YouTube, and is referred to as the anthem of the revolution. In 2011, it was selected by Time Out as the third-most world-changing song of all time. His 2018 song Balaha led to six individuals being arrested in Egypt that were, either correctly or incorrectly, assumed to be connected to Ramy and the song. Among them were the writer of the song, but also a former band member that had not worked on the record.  In May 2020 Shady Habash one of the detainees died After being incarcerated for more than two years in pretrial detention. Egypt's public prosecutor has said he mistakenly drank hand sanitiser in his cell, thinking it was water.

Ramy's songs were banned in Egypt and he was unable to perform public shows. Since late 2014, Ramy has been living in Finland and Sweden, which gave him again the chance to create and perform freely to spread his message as an ambassador of the Egyptian revolution.

During 2016 and 2017, Ramy toured throughout Finland with the theatre monologue RAMY – In the Frontline, which also gathered 5 stars reviews at the Fringe Festival Edinburgh.

Ramy stands for gender equality, freedom, social justice, equity, health care, minority rights, education and peace.

Discography

Albums
 Manshourat (2011)
 El Masala (2012)
 Mamnoua''' (2014)
 Resala Ela Magles El Amn ("A Letter To The UN Security Council") (2017)
 In 2017, Ramy released his album on Universal Music MENA. The album is a mix of re-recorded older tracks and new compositions. The lyrical topics range from depictions of daily hardships of normal people, the struggle for social justice and women's rights, environmental issues and criticism of the regime.

Singles
 Segn Bel Alwan (2016)
 (featuring Lebanese rapper Malikah) was released in 2016. The song highlighting women's situation and the issue of gender equality in his home country, became a big hit and one of the most streamed videos in Egypt in the weeks after its release.
 The Camp (2017)
 Ramy collaborated with UK artist PJ Harvey, released in June 2017 to benefit displaced children in the Lebanese Bekaa Valley fleeing the Syrian Civil War. 
 Balaha (2018)
 On February 26, 2018, Ramy released a song and music video called Balaha which mocked Egyptian president Abdel Fatah al-Sisi. Balaha led to eight arrests back in Egypt; two remain in detention as of April 2020, and a third, music video director Shady Habash, died in prison in 2020, allegedly from "health issues not yet specified", at the age of twenty-four after living over two years in pre-trial detention. The video has received over five million YouTube views.
 Muqawma (Resistance) '' (2021)
 A song based on a poem by Egyptian activist Ahmed Douma from the revolutionaries of Egypt to the revolutionaries of Palestine.

Awards, nominations and honors 
 #3 on the list "100 Songs That Changed History", Timeout Magazine
 "Freedom To Create" prize winner, 2011
 Music Rights Champion, 2016, International Music Council
 Spirit of Folk Award, 2017, Folk Alliance Festival, US
 GrupYorum Award, 2020, “Tenco 2020 Award” - Sanremo - Italy

References

External links
 

1987 births
Living people
Egyptian musicians
People from Mansoura, Egypt
Egyptian revolution of 2011